Love FM is a commercial radio station based in north Kyushu island, Japan, broadcasting on 76.1 FM from the Fukuoka park side studio to the Kyushu area. Love FM airs mostly music covering a wide range of styles. It is also the third launched international multiple-language radio station in Japan.

First "broadcasting operational company (Hoso Jigyosha)" registered under "broadcasting license (Hoso Jigyo Menkyo)" at launch of the service, was "Kyushu International FM K.K. ", based in Tenjin, Fukuoka-shi, Fukuoka-ken.

Since January 1, 2011, the registrant for this broadcasting operational company has been updated under the name of "Tenjin FM K.K.", which used to run a community FM station called "FREE WAVE".

Programs are broadcast in 10 languages to over 1,000,000 Japanese and 70,000 foreigners on FM wave (along with 140,000,000 Japanese nationwide.) The reception areas are Fukuoka/ Saga/ Kumamoto/ Oita/ Nagasaki 76.1 MHz, and Fukuoka nishi 82.5 MHz, a part of Yamaguchi/ Kitakyushu 82.7 MHz.

History 
1997: On April 1 opens as the third multi-lingual radio station in Japan.
1999: On December 1 joins MegaNet.
2002: On February 11 Fukuoka Tower transmission begins.

See also 
 MegaNet
 InterFM
 FM COCOLO
 Radio Neo

References

External links 
 Official website 

Love FM
Mass media in Fukuoka
Filipino-language radio stations
Radio stations established in 1997